Sergio Arribas may refer to:
Sergio Arribas (footballer, born 1995), Spanish footballer for Villarubia CF
Sergio Arribas (footballer, born 2001), Spanish footballer for Real Madrid Castilla